Dag is a Norwegian comedy-drama television series which originally aired on the Norwegian television channel TV 2 from 2010 to 2015. The series is about a marriage guidance counsellor, Dag (Atle Antonsen), who has little faith in people or marriage.

Cast

Episodes

Series 1 (2010)

Series 2 (2011)

Series 3 (2013)

Series 4 (2015)

Broadcast 
Dag was first broadcast in Norway on TV 2 (Norway).

Sveriges Television began showing the series in Sweden 18 October 2011
.

Yle Fem started broadcasting the programme in Finland in 2013
.

In the United Kingdom, it was first shown on Sky Arts in 2015
.

References

External links 
 

2010s Norwegian television series
2010 Norwegian television series debuts
2015 Norwegian television series endings
Norwegian comedy television series
Norwegian drama television series
TV 2 (Norway) original programming